Lumbye is the surname of several different people:
 Hans Christian Lumbye, Danish composer
 Carl Lumbye, Danish composer and conductor, son of Hans Christian Lumbye
 Georg Lumbye, Danish composer and conductor, son of Hans Christian Lumbye
 Theodor "Tippe" Lumbye, Danish composer and conductor, son of Georg Lumbye
 Knud Lumbye, Danish actor

See also
Lumby (surname)

Danish-language surnames